Anania shafferi is a moth in the family Crambidae. It was described by Speidel and Hanigk in 1990. It is found in Afghanistan.

References

Moths described in 1990
Pyraustinae
Moths of Asia